Dolla may refer to:

 Dolla (rapper) (1987–2009), American rapper
 Dolla, County Tipperary
 "Dolla", a song by Fort Minor from the 2006 single S.C.O.M. / Dolla / Get It / Spraypaint & Ink Pens
 Dolla (girl group)

See also
 Dom Dolla
 Dame D.O.L.L.A.
 Top Dolla